Schine may refer to:

 Cathleen Schine (born 1953), American author
 Gerard David Schine (1927–1996), central figure in the Army-McCarthy Hearings of 1954
 Junius Myer Schine (1890–1971), theater owner and father of Gerard
 Hillevi Rombin Schine (1933–1996), Swedish national decathlon champion and wife of Gerard

See also

 Shine (disambiguation)